Lewis Spur is a rock spur  west of Frost Spur on the north side of Dufek Massif, in the Pensacola Mountains of Antarctica. It was mapped by the United States Geological Survey from surveys and U.S. Navy air photos, 1956–66, and was named by the Advisory Committee on Antarctic Names for Atles F. Lewis, an aviation structural mechanic in the Ellsworth Station winter party, 1957.

References

Ridges of Queen Elizabeth Land